David Campos Guaderrama (born May 23, 1954) is a United States district judge of the United States District Court for the Western District of Texas.

Biography
Guaderrama was born in Las Cruces, New Mexico and spent the early part of his life in Deming, New Mexico. His family moved to El Paso, Texas, in 1966, where he graduated from Cathedral High School in 1972. Guaderrama received his Bachelor of Arts degree in 1975 from New Mexico State University and his Juris Doctor in 1979 from the University of Notre Dame Law School. He entered solo private practice in 1979 and became a partner of Guaderrama and Guaderrama from 1980 to 1986. He served as Chief Public Defender of El Paso County, Texas, from 1987 to 1994. Guaderrama served as District Judge of the 243rd District Court of Texas in El Paso County from 1995 to 2010. Judges of Texas district courts are elected in partisan elections: Guaderrama ran under the Democratic Party banner.

Federal judicial service

United States magistrate service 
In October 2010, he was appointed magistrate judge of the United States District Court for the Western District of Texas.

District court service 
On September 14, 2011, President Barack Obama nominated Guaderrama to be a United States District Judge of the United States District Court for the Western District of Texas, to the seat vacated by Judge David Briones who took senior status on February 26, 2009. On November 2, 2011, he received a hearing before the Senate Judiciary Committee and his nomination was reported to the floor on December 1, 2011. Guaderrama's nomination was confirmed by voice vote on April 26, 2012. He received his commission on April 30, 2012.

See also
List of Hispanic/Latino American jurists

References

External links

1954 births
Judges of the United States District Court for the Western District of Texas
Living people
New Mexico State University alumni
Notre Dame Law School alumni
People from El Paso, Texas
People from Las Cruces, New Mexico
Public defenders
Texas Democrats
Texas state court judges
United States district court judges appointed by Barack Obama
21st-century American judges
United States magistrate judges
Hispanic and Latino American judges
People from Deming, New Mexico